Charles F. Sams III is an American government official who is the director of the National Park Service, the first Native American to serve in the role. He is also a member of the Northwest Power and Conservation Council.

Early life and education
A native of Pendleton, Oregon, Sams graduated from Pendleton High School in 1988. He earned a Bachelor of Arts degree in business administration from Concordia University in 2003 and a Master of Legal Studies from the University of Oklahoma College of Law in 2020.

Career
From 1988 to 1992, Sams served as an intelligence specialist in the United States Navy, where he was assigned to VA-128, Carrier Air Wing Two, Joint Intelligence Center, and the Defense Intelligence Agency Headquarters. After leaving the Navy, Sams was a data analyst and spokesman for the Confederated Tribes of the Umatilla Indian Reservation. 

When the tribes started a land buyback program, Sams wrote an editorial explaining how the Dawes Allotment Act of 1887 led the reservation to be subdivided and sold to white settlers.

He was also an executive director and vice president of the Earth Conservation Corps. In 2003 and 2004, he was the executive director of the Community Energy Project. From 2004 to 2006, he was a member of the Columbia Slough Watershed Council. From 2006 to 2010, Sams was the national director of the tribal and native lands program at the Trust for Public Land. Sams also held administrative positions at the Umatilla Tribal Community Foundation and Indian Country Conservancy. In April 2021, Sams was appointed to serve as a member of the Northwest Power and Conservation Council by Oregon Governor Kate Brown.

He was confirmed as the National Park Service director on November 18, 2021 and sworn in on December 16 of the same year. Sams, an enrolled member of the Cayuse and Walla Walla tribes, is the first Native American to serve in that position.

References

Year of birth missing (living people)
Living people
American conservationists
Biden administration personnel
Concordia University (Oregon) alumni
Directors of the National Park Service
People from Pendleton, Oregon
United States Navy sailors
University of Oklahoma College of Law alumni
Cayuse people
Walla Walla people